Melanie Ann Weston (born 26 July 1980), known professionally as Madeleine West, is an Australian actress. She is known for her television roles, having played Dee Bliss and Andrea Somers on the soap opera Neighbours from 2000 to 2003 and on-off 2017 to 2020, high-class escort Mel on Satisfaction from 2007 to 2010, Dimity on House Husbands in 2013, Danielle McGuire in Underbelly and later Fat Tony & Co. In 2016, West joined the cast of The Wrong Girl. She has also written a parenting book called Six Under Eight. She played Sarah the wife of Stone Cold Steve Austin in the WWE produced film The Condemned in 2007.

Early life
Born Melanie Ann Weston, West was raised in Woodend. She attended Woodend Primary School and eight high schools because her family followed her stepfather's engineering work around the country. West began performing in front of family and friends at an early age. In 1992, she entered the New South Wales Talented Child Drama Ensemble and later studied at Swinburne University of Technology, Tamworth Conservatorium of Music, and Riverina Drama Ensemble.

In January 2023, West revealed she was sexually abused as a child; the abuse began when she was 5 years old and continued for five years. She said, "Part of the reason I went into acting was to wear someone else's skin, to hide what was actually happening in my life".

Career
After commencing a degree in law at Deakin University, West deferred her studies indefinitely to turn to acting. In 1999, West was awarded the 'Be Your Best' Performance Scholarship from the Australian Drug Foundation. West's amateur theatre credits include Arsenic and Old Lace, Night Reflections, Theatre in the Raw, Bye Bye Birdie, and Snow Queen.

West joined the cast of Neighbours as Dee Bliss in 1999. Two years later, she was nominated for the "Most Popular New Female Talent" Logie Award. In March 2003, it was announced West was to leave Neighbours after her contract expired. She filmed her final scenes in early April.

West appeared in crime drama Underbelly as Danielle McGuire in 2008. In 2011, she joined the cast of Winners & Losers in the recurring role of Deidre Gross. West previously turned down a role with the show due to being heavily pregnant with her third child.

In 2013, West appeared in series two of House Husbands as Dimity. West reprised her role of Danielle McGuire in the Underbelly spin-off series Fat Tony & Co.. The series focuses on the rise and fall of Tony Mokbel, who also featured in the original series, played by Robert Mammone.

In 2017, West returned to Neighbours to play Andrea Somers, a lookalike who posed as Dee Bliss. West also joined the cast of The Wrong Girl as TV host Erica Jones. Her first book titled Six Under Eight was published in March of that year, and West has since launched a series of children's books called Lily D, V.A.P.

West worked with former detective Gary Jubelin on the 2023 eight-part podcast series Predatory, which brings attention to child sexual abuse. The podcast called for Australia's sex offender registry to be made public and for victims to be fairly compensated.

Personal life
West was engaged to Shopping for Love co-host Pete Lazer, before entering into a relationship with Shannon Bennett, a restaurateur, in 2005. The couple have six children together; Phoenix (born December 2005), Hendrix (born April 2008), Xascha (born July 2010), Xanthe (born 2012) and twins, Xalia and Margaux (2014). West commented that the Xs in the names did not start out as intentional. In September 2018, West confirmed that she and Bennett had separated, but were "striving to reconnect as friends and parents." 

West has been in a relationship with environmentalist Maximo Bottaro since 2020, after meeting him while volunteering at his organisation ReForest Now.

In July 2002, West was hit by a bus in Sydney. The actress was also robbed while she was unconscious. She needed reconstructive plastic surgery and had to be written out of Neighbours but returned to the show a month later.

Filmography

References

External links
 
 Profile from Neighbours
 Madeleine West's character Mel from Satisfaction

1980 births
Living people
AACTA Award winners
Australian soap opera actresses
Actresses from Melbourne
Swinburne University of Technology alumni